The 1915 Middle Tennessee State Normal football team represented the Middle Tennessee State Normal School (now known as Middle Tennessee State University) during the 1915 college football season. The head coach was Alfred B. Miles serving his third season with the team.

Schedule

References

Middle Tennessee State Normal
Middle Tennessee Blue Raiders football seasons
Middle Tennessee State Normal football